John Axel Eriksson (born 5 January 1978 in Falkenberg, Sweden) is a Swedish actor.

Filmography
Beck – Den svaga länken (2007)
Falkenberg Farewell (2006)

References

External links
 John Axel Eriksson's website

1978 births
Living people
People from Falkenberg
Swedish male actors